Venkatapuram is a small village in the midway between Kurnool and Kadapa on National Highway-18 in Nandyal District of Andhra Pradesh.

History

The village is named after Lord Venkateswara as it hosted seven residents initially, resembling the seven hills of Tirumala

References 

Villages in Kurnool district